The Cliniques universitaires Saint-Luc (UCLouvain Saint-Luc) is a non-profit academic hospital of the University of Louvain (UCLouvain), located on the university campus of UCLouvain Bruxelles Woluwe in Woluwe-Saint-Lambert, Brussels, Belgium. The hospital opened on 23 August 1976, moving from Leuven to Brussels.

History
In 1968 the Catholic University of Louvain acquired some land in the east of Brussels, which did not have a large hospital at that time. When the university split in two, the French-speaking departments moved from Leuven to Ottignies to found the new city of Louvain-la-Neuve, except for the medical faculty and health sciences sector, which moved to a newly built Brussels campus, now called UCLouvain Bruxelles Woluwe.

It is one of the two main university hospitals of the Université catholique de Louvain, the other being the CHU UCLouvain Namur, in the Walloon province of Namur.

Research
Being a teaching and university hospital UCLouvain Saint-Luc continues to do ground breaking medical research. For example, the first baby born after ovarian transplant and the first photograph of human ovulation.

Famous people born at Cliniques universitaires Saint-Luc 
Prince Amedeo, Princess Maria Laura and Prince Joachim, born in 1986, 1988 and 1991 respectively.
Princess Louise of Belgium, twins Prince Nicolas of Belgium and Prince Aymeric of Belgium, born in 2004 and 2005, respectively.

References

External links
 Official web site 

Université catholique de Louvain
Hospital buildings completed in 1976
Buildings and structures in Brussels
Education in Brussels
Hospitals established in 1976
Hospitals in Belgium
Medical research institutes in Belgium
1976 establishments in Belgium
Woluwe-Saint-Lambert
Teaching hospitals